Ashfield Boys' High School is a government-funded comprehensive single-sex secondary school for boys, located on Liverpool Road, in Ashfield, an inner western suburb of Sydney, New South Wales, Australia.

Established in 1962, the school enrolled approximately 730 students in 2018, from Year 7 to Year 12, of whom one percent identified as Indigenous Australians and 83 percent were from a language background other than English. The school is operated by the NSW Department of Education in accordance with a curriculum developed by the New South Wales Education Standards Authority; the principal is Dwayne Hopwood.

History

Part of the school land area was once used by the Australian Army. The land (gym and sheds) have since been acquired by the school and the site rebuilt.

The Drill Hall was built in the 1800s and was home to the local citizen militia and other volunteer military units. In 1913 the land was acquired by the Department of Defence as the Ashfield Corps continued to grow. In 1915 it was the second to last stop for the Gilgandra Rifle Club on their Cooee March before 240 men were sent to war. In 1939 the Army sheds were built to house armoured vehicles (25 in total). The last company to be stationed at the depot were the 3 Company Royal Australian Army Service Corps Infantry Division, leaving in the 1960s.

Royal visit 
On 4 November 2014, His Royal Highness Prince Edward, Earl of Wessex visited Ashfield Boys High School. The visit was to mark the 50th anniversary of The Duke of Edinburgh's Award in Australia. The Prince met with students from eight Sydney inner west schools.

Notable alumni
Craig Alexanderironman; three-times Hawaiian Ironman World Champion (2008, 2009 & 2011)
Graeme Innes Human Rights Commissioner and Commissioner Responsible for Disability Discrimination for the Human Rights and Equal Opportunity Commission
Keaon KoloamatangiSouth Sydney Rabbitohs Rugby League player.
Salesi Ma'afurugby union player; played with the Wallabies
Dirk Wellhamcricketer; played with the Australia cricket team and captained the NSW cricket team
Angus Younglead guitarist for Australian rock band AC/DC, known for wearing the Ashfield Boys High School uniform on stage
Malcolm Youngformer rhythm guitarist for the Australian rock band AC/DC

See also

 List of government schools in New South Wales
 List of boys' schools in New South Wales
 Education in Australia

References

External links
 

Public high schools in Sydney
Boys' schools in New South Wales
Educational institutions established in 1962
1962 establishments in Australia